Colombo is a lunar impact crater that lies on the strip of rough continental terrain between Mare Fecunditatis to the east and Mare Nectaris in the west. It is located to the south of the crater Goclenius, and northwest of Cook, and is named for the late 15th and early 16th century Italian explorer Christopher Columbus.

The rim of Colombo is circular, although slightly indented along the northwest where Colombo A intrudes slightly into the interior. The inner wall is asymmetrical, being much more narrow to the north and northwest and wider to the southeast. The rim is somewhat eroded, and several tiny craterlets lie along the inner wall to the southeast. The small satellite  Colombo B lies across the south-southwestern rim.

Satellite craters
By convention these features are identified on lunar maps by placing the letter on the side of the crater midpoint that is closest to Colombo.

References

 
 
 
 
 
 
 
 
 
 
 
 

Impact craters on the Moon